Lou Fleischer (July 16, 1891 – November 16, 1985) was an American arranger, composer, and the brother of Max and Dave Fleischer. He was the head of the Fleischer Studios Music Department until the company was reorganized as Famous Studios in 1942. He is thought to have been the voice of J. Wellington Wimpy in "I Wanna Be a Lifeguard” from the Popeye film series in 1936.

Following his dismissal at the changeover to Famous Studios, Fleischer worked as a Lens Grinder for the World War II effort, and later worked for the Army Signal Corps Film Unit in New York.  For a short period in the 1940s he did scoring for George Pal and taught piano while residing in Redondo Beach, California until his retirement in the late 1960s.

References

External links

American animators
American male composers
American composers
American Jews
American male voice actors
American people of Austrian-Jewish descent
American people of Polish-Jewish descent
Animation composers
1891 births
1985 deaths
Male actors from New York City
Fleischer family
Fleischer Studios people
20th-century American male musicians